Springtown Historic District is a national historic district located in Springtown, Springfield Township, Bucks County, Pennsylvania.  The district includes 143 contributing buildings and 1 contributing structure in the rural village of Springtown and surrounding area. They include a variety of residential, commercial, and institutional buildings built between 1738 and 1956. The buildings include modest Georgian and Federal style residences. Notable buildings include the Conrad Hess Mansion House (c. 1807), White Horse Tavern, Sarah Dean Tenant House, Kooker-Eakin Farm, Springtown Inn (c. 1830), S.G. Mills General Store, Salem United Methodist Church (1842, 1868), Christ Evangelical Lutheran Church (1872), Grace Church (1888), and Franklin Grange Building (c. 1892).  Located within the district is the separately listed John Eakin Farm (1738).

It was added to the National Register of Historic Places in 2007.

References

External links
Tattersall Inn at the Stover Mansion website

Historic districts in Bucks County, Pennsylvania
Greek Revival architecture in Pennsylvania
Italianate architecture in Pennsylvania
Historic districts on the National Register of Historic Places in Pennsylvania
National Register of Historic Places in Bucks County, Pennsylvania